Eatonia (Elvie Smith) Municipal Airport  is a registered aerodrome located adjacent to Eatonia, Saskatchewan, Canada. It is named for the local community and Elvie L. Smith, former president and Chairman of Pratt and Whitney Canada.

The airport has one large hangar type building just south of Eatonia Heritage Park (former railway siding). The runway is a turf (grass) strip with no markings. The airport handles small propeller aircraft only.

See also 
List of airports in Saskatchewan

References

External links
Page about this airport on COPA's Places to Fly airport directory

Registered aerodromes in Saskatchewan